Future World is the second album by the Danish hard rock/heavy metal band Pretty Maids. The album was released by CBS in 1987. By 1990, the album had sold 300,000 copies worldwide. The album charted at number 165 on the Billboard 200 in the United States.

Future World was produced by Eddie Kramer, who was fired during the recording sessions because he fell asleep at the mixing console, according to guitarist Ken Hammer. The band  then finished the album with engineer Chris Isca, who was credited as co-producer on the album. Mixing duties were shared between Metallica, Rainbow and Morbid Angel producer Flemming Rasmussen, and Kevin Elson, known for producing multiplatinum albums by Journey, Mr. Big and Europe.

Track listing
All tracks written and arranged by Ronnie Atkins and Ken Hammer.

Personnel
Ronnie Atkins – lead & backing vocals
Ken Hammer – guitars
Allan Delong – bass guitar
Phil Moorhead – drums
Alan Owen – keyboards

Guest Musicians
Graham Bonnet - backing vocals (tracks 2, 5)
Philip Hart - backing vocals (tracks 2, 3, 5, 6)

Other Staff
Eddie Kramer - producer, engineer
Aaron Hurwitz - engineer
Chris Isca - mixer (tracks 8), engineer, co-producer
George Cowan - engineer
Ken Lonas - engineer
Thom Cadley - engineer
Tommy Hansen - additional recordings
Morten Henningsen - additional recordings assistant
Flemming Rasmussen - mixer (tracks 1, 2, 4, 5, 7)
Kevin Elson - mixer (tracks: 3, 6, 7)
Frank Birch - assistant mixer (tracks 1, 2, 4, 5, 7)
Wally Buck - assistant mixer (tracks 3, 6, 9)
Bob Ludwig - mastering

References

1987 albums
Pretty Maids albums
Albums produced by Eddie Kramer
Columbia Records albums
Albums with cover art by Joe Petagno